Markid (also Romanized as Markīd; also known as Margīd and Markit) is a village in Bedevostan-e Gharbi Rural District, Khvajeh District, Heris County, East Azerbaijan Province, Iran. At the 2006 census, its population was 614, in 132 families.

Name 
According to Vladimir Minorsky, the name "Margid" is derived from the historical Mongol tribe of Merkit.

References 

Populated places in Heris County